La Veuve Couderc is a novel by Belgian writer Georges Simenon. It was first published in 1942. The novel was published at around the same time as Camus' The Stranger. Both novels contain a similar main character and themes, and Simenon was upset that Camus' work went on to greater acclaim.

The novel was republished as The Widow by NYRB Classics in 2009.

References

1942 Belgian novels
French-language novels
Novels by Georges Simenon
Novels set in France